This list of dinosaur ichnogenera is a comprehensive listing of all ichnogenera that have been attributed to dinosaurs, excluding class Aves (birds, both living and those known only from fossils) and purely vernacular terms. The list includes all commonly accepted ichnogenera, but also genera that are now considered invalid, doubtful (nomen dubium), or were not formally published (nomen nudum), as well as junior synonyms of more established names, and ichnogenera that are no longer attributed to dinosaurs.

Scope and terminology 
There is no official, canonical list of dinosaur ichnogenera. An extensive list can be found in an appendix to Donald F. Glut's third supplement to his series of dinosaur encyclopedias (2003).  The vast majority of citations are based on Glut's list; exceptions, such as more recent ichnotaxa, are noted. Synonymies are also after Glut.

A

B

C

D

E

F

G

H

I

J

K

L

M

N

O



P

Q

R

S

T

U

V



W

X

Y

Z

See also

List of dinosaurs
List of dinosaur oogenera

References

 
Ichnogenera